Geoff Martin (born 25 June 1958) is  a former Australian rules footballer who played with Richmond in the Victorian Football League (VFL).

Notes

External links 

Living people
1958 births
Australian rules footballers from Victoria (Australia)
Richmond Football Club players